Aurora is a city in the Chicago metropolitan area. Located primarily in DuPage and Kane Counties, it is the second most populous city in Illinois, after Chicago, and the 144th most populous city in the United States. The population was 197,899 at the 2010 census, and was 180,542 at the 2020 census.

Founded within Kane County, Aurora's city limits have expanded into DuPage, Kendall, and Will counties. Once a mid-sized manufacturing city, Aurora has grown since the 1960s. From 2000 to 2009, the U.S. Census Bureau ranked the city as the 46th fastest growing city with a population of over 100,000.

In 1908, Aurora adopted the nickname "City of Lights", because in 1881 it was one of the first cities in the United States to implement an all-electric street lighting system. Aurora's historic downtown is located on the Fox River, and centered on Stolp Island. The city is divided into three regions, the West Side, on the west side of the Fox River, the East Side, between the eastern bank of the Fox River and the Kane/DuPage County line, and the Far East Side/Fox Valley, which is from the County Line to the city's eastern border with Naperville.

The Aurora area has some significant architecture, including structures by Frank Lloyd Wright, Ludwig Mies van der Rohe, Bruce Goff and George Grant Elmslie. Aurora is also home to over 50 Sears Catalog Homes and seven Lustron all-steel homes.

History
Before European settlers arrived, there was a Native American village in what is today downtown Aurora, on the banks of the Fox River. In 1834, following the Black Hawk War, the McCarty brothers settled on both sides of the river, but subsequently sold their land on the west side to the Lake brothers, who opened a mill. The McCartys lived on and operated a mill on the east side. Aurora was established with the building of a post office in 1837.

Aurora began as two villages: East Aurora, incorporated in 1845 on the east side of the river, and West Aurora, formally organized on the west side of the river in 1854. In 1857, the two towns joined, incorporating as the city of Aurora.  Representatives could not agree which side of the river should house the public buildings, so most of them were built on or around Stolp Island in the middle of the river.

As the city grew, it attracted numerous factories and jobs. In 1849, after failing to attract the Galena and Chicago Union Railroad building west from Chicago, the Aurora Branch Railroad was chartered to build a connection from Aurora to the G&CU at a place called Turner Junction, now West Chicago. Additional lines were built, including a direct line to Chicago, and in 1855 the company was reorganized into the Chicago, Burlington and Quincy Railroad. The CB&Q located its roundhouse and locomotive shop in Aurora, becoming the town's largest employer until the 1960s. Restructuring in the railroad industry resulted in a loss of jobs as passenger traffic dropped and the number of railroads decreased. The Burlington Railroad ran regularly scheduled passenger trains to Chicago. Other railroads built lines to Aurora, including the Chicago & Northwestern Railway to Geneva, the Elgin, Joliet and Eastern Railway to Joliet, Chicago, Milwaukee & Gary to Rockford, and the interurbans Chicago Aurora and Elgin Railroad, Aurora, Elgin and Fox River Electric Company, Chicago, Aurora and DeKalb Railroad, and Aurora, Plainfield and Joliet Railroad. With the exception of the EJ&E main line on the east side of the city, all lines other than the former Burlington lines have been abandoned.

The heavy industries on the East side provided employment for generations of European immigrants, who came from Ireland, Great Britain, Scandinavia, Luxembourg, Germany, France, Romania and Italy. Aurora became the economic center of the Fox Valley region. The combination of these three factors—a highly industrialized town, a sizable river that divided it, and the Burlington railroad's shops—accounted for much of the dynamics of Aurora's political, economic, and social history. The city openly supported abolitionism before the American Civil War. Mexican migrants began arriving after the Mexican Revolution of 1910. Socially, the town was progressive in its attitude toward education, religion, welfare, and women. The first free public school district in Illinois was established in 1851 here and the city established a high school for girls in 1855.

The city developed as a manufacturing powerhouse which lasted until the early 1970s, when the railroad shops closed. Many other factories and industrial areas relocated or went out of business. By 1980, there were few industrial areas operating in the city, and unemployment soared to 16%. During the late 1970s and early 1980s, development began in the Far East side along the Eola Road and Route 59 areas. This was financially beneficial to the city, but it sapped retail businesses downtown and manufacturing in the industrial sectors of the near East and West Sides, weakening them. In the mid-1980s crime rates soared and street gangs formed.

During this time Aurora became much more ethnically diverse. The Latino population grew rapidly in the city during the 1980s. In the late 1980s, several business and industrial parks were established on the city's outskirts. In 1993, the Hollywood Casino was built downtown, which helped bring the first redevelopment to the downtown area in nearly twenty years. In the late 1990s, more development began in the rural areas and towns outside Aurora. Subdivisions sprouted up around the city, and Aurora's population soared.

Today, Aurora is an ethnically diverse city of nearly 200,000 residents. Historic areas downtown are being redeveloped, and new developments are being built across the city.

Geography

Aurora is at  (41.7637855, −88.2901352).

While the city has traditionally been regarded as being in Kane County, Aurora also includes parts of DuPage, Kendall and Will counties. Aurora is one of only three cities in Illinois that span four counties. (The others are Barrington Hills and Centralia.)

Regions of Aurora
Politically, the city is divided into 10 wards. Large portions of Aurora can be described as being within three regions:

 The West Side, which is west of the Fox River.
 The East Side, which spans the region east of the Fox River, stopping at the DuPage County line.
 The Far East Side, a portion of Aurora east of the DuPage County line
These three regions are partly depicted in police boundaries and school districts.

Climate

The annual precipitation for Aurora is about 40 inches.

Flooding occurred in almost every low-lying area in the city, and in neighborhoods bordering the Fox River, causing major damage in some neighborhoods. The flooding was just as bad in Blackberry Creek, on Aurora's far west side.

Aurora has not been struck by any major tornadoes in recent history, although they occur in Northern Illinois annually. In 1906, a tornado went through the Aurora Driving Park, a large recreation/amusement park and race track where the Riddle Highlands neighborhood and Northgate shopping center is today. The tornado hit during the afternoon performance of the Ringling Brothers "Greatest Show on Earth" circus, when the park was crowded. It killed 2 people and injured 22, but the grandstand was still filled for the evening performance. Weak tornadoes struck the city in 1954, 1958, 1960, and 1991. In 1990, the supercell thunderstorm that produced the deadly Plainfield Tornado passed over the city, dropping golf ball sized hail and causing wind damage. Less than ten minutes after passing through Aurora, the storm produced an F5 tornado, which touched down in nearby Oswego, less than 5 miles from downtown. The tornado then traveled through Plainfield and Joliet, killing 29 people.

The city can receive heavy snowfall and experiences blizzards periodically.

Aurora was hit with one of the strongest earthquakes ever to strike Illinois, a M 5.1, on May 26, 1909. It put cracks through chimneys and could be felt  around.

Demographics
As of the 2020 census there were 180,542 people, 65,128 households, and 47,579 families residing in the city. The racial makeup of the city was 40.63% White, 10.87% African American, 1.65% Native American, 10.97% Asian, 0.05% Pacific Islander, 20.73% from other races, and 15.11% from two or more races. Hispanic or Latino of any race were 41.53% of the population.

There were 65,128 households, out of which 77.89% had children under the age of 18 living with them, 52.31% were married couples living together, 14.65% had a female householder with no husband present, and 26.95% were non-families. 21.39% of all households were made up of individuals, and 7.71% had someone living alone who was 65 years of age or older. The average household size was 3.56 and the average family size was 3.03.

The city's age distribution consisted of 28.2% under the age of 18, 9.6% from 18 to 24, 29% from 25 to 44, 23.2% from 45 to 64, and 9.8% who were 65 years of age or older. The median age was 34.4 years. For every 100 females, there were 98.7 males. For every 100 females age 18 and over, there were 95.1 males.

The median income for a household in the city was $74,659, and the median income for a family was $83,464. Males had a median income of $43,680 versus $30,572 for females. The per capita income for the city was $32,537. About 8.3% of families and 10.6% of the population were below the poverty line, including 14.7% of those under age 18 and 9.9% of those age 65 or over.

Note: the US Census treats Hispanic/Latino as an ethnic category. This table excludes Latinos from the racial categories and assigns them to a separate category. Hispanics/Latinos can be of any race.

Economy
Aurora is on the edge of the Illinois Technology and Research Corridor. The city has a long tradition of manufacturing as does much of Chicago metropolitan area. Prominent manufacturers, past and present include Lyon Workspace Products, The Aurora Silverplate Manufacturing Company, Barber-Greene Company, the Chicago Corset Company, the Aurora Brewing Company, Stephens-Adamson Company, Caterpillar Inc., Western Electric, Allsteel Metals, National Metalwares, and Western Wheeled Scraper Works (later Austin-Western Inc.). The most prominent employer and industry was the Chicago Burlington and Quincy Railroad (later Burlington Northern) which was headquartered in Aurora. The CB&Q Roundhouse is still standing, and is now the popular restaurant originally called Walter Payton's Roundhouse; after the Payton estate ended its involvement in 2009 it became known as America's Historic Roundhouse, and after a 2011 change in ownership, it is now known as Two Brothers Roundhouse.

Tourism
Formed in 1987, the Aurora Area Convention and Visitors Bureau (AACVB) is a private, nonprofit organization dedicated to aggressively promoting and marketing the area as a premier overnight destination. The AACVB'S goal is to enhance the economic and environmental well-being of a region comprising ten communities: Aurora, Batavia, Big Rock, Hinckley, Montgomery, North Aurora, Oswego, Plano, Sugar Grove, and Yorkville.

Largest employers
According to the city's 2019 Comprehensive Annual Financial Report, the city's largest employers are:

Arts and culture
Aurora's downtown is full of architectural landmarks and historic places. It includes a major Hindu temple, the Sri Venkateswara Swami Temple of Greater Chicago. Aurora also has its own zoo, Phillips Park Zoo, in Phillips Park.

Downtown Aurora

Downtown Aurora is home to the Paramount Theatre, a large live performance theater on the National Register of Historic Places, and the Hollywood Casino. There is also the Leland Tower, a former hotel which was the tallest building in Illinois outside of Chicago and is on the National Register of Historic Places. The largest collection of commercial buildings by Prairie School architect George Grant Elmslie is here. The main building of Aurora Public Library and a branch campus of Waubonsee Community College are also located downtown.

Downtown Alive, a festival that includes live music and a variety of food booths, is held on three weekends (Friday and Saturday night) in the summer; Blues on the Fox (featuring national blues artists) is held on the Friday and Saturday of Father's Day weekend. Roughly 8,000–13,000 people attend. The quarterly AuroraArtWalk is hosted by the Cultural Creatives—a grassroots team of local artists, property owners, patrons, and the City of Aurora. The Riverfront Playhouse is a not-for-profit theater that has held a storefront location in downtown Aurora since 1978.

A fixture of Downtown Aurora, the Waubonsee Community College Campus, which was formerly located on Stolp Island near the Paramount Theatre, closed in May 2011. A new and greatly expanded campus was built on the western banks of the river, between the river and IL Route 31. The construction of the campus was part of a larger plan to redevelop the Downtown area, putting in parks and new walking paths, and making the area more inviting. The plan also included a pedestrian bridge to connect the banks of the river. Also in the works is a plan to modify or reconstruct the bridges to Stolp Island, which have not been maintained for nearly 60 years.

Museums
 Aurora Historical Society
 Aurora Regional Fire Museum
 The Aurora Public Arts Commission
 Grand Army of the Republic Hall
 Phillips Park Zoo
 David L. Pierce Art and History Center
 SciTech Interactive Science Museum
 Schingoethe Museum of Native American Culture

Commemorative street names

Popular culture
Wayne's World (1992) is a buddy film set in Aurora, with characters developed from a skit on the television show Saturday Night Live. One of the authors was from neighboring Naperville, Illinois, and thought Aurora had the appropriate blue-collar feel desired. Most of the movie was filmed elsewhere, but some small sections were filmed on location in Aurora. One scene shows the local White Castle. The film's sequel, Wayne's World 2, is also set in Aurora.

Sports

The Aurora Islanders/Blues/Foxes, a minor league baseball franchise, played from 1910 to 1915 in the Wisconsin-Illinois League. Their most famous player was Casey Stengel, who played one season with the team before being bought by the Brooklyn Dodgers. Stengel batted .352 and was the batting champion of the league for 1911; he also led the league with 50 stolen bases and had 27 outfield assists. The team played in a stadium on the west side in the former Riverview Park. He became known as a manager of baseball teams.

Waubonsie Valley High School (IPSD—District 204) Boys Soccer has won the Northern Illinois regional championship in this highly competitive region 21 times since 1987, and WVHS Girls Soccer has won the regional championship 19 times in that time frame. In 2007, the Waubonsie Valley High School girls' team won the state championship; it was ranked #1 of all high school girls' soccer teams in the United States after finishing with an undefeated season.

Aurora has numerous youth soccer clubs, most of which have teams represented in the top five percent of the Northern Illinois Soccer League. Several youth soccer players from Aurora have received college scholarships to major college soccer programs throughout the U.S. In addition, Aurora maintains several developmental advantages for soccer enthusiasts. Three high-quality indoor soccer venues allow year-round soccer training and competition for children and adults. Additionally, several area traveling soccer clubs, as well as high schools, boast coaches and trainers who have played soccer professionally or have been starting players for national teams. Some played for teams that won the World Cup. Supplementing the local soccer training regimen are professional soccer trainers from England, Brazil, The Netherlands, Scotland, and other countries. Several played in the Premier League and for the Brazil national team, and for the Argentina national team.

Fastpitch softball has been in Aurora since the 1930s. It gained popularity after World War II when the Aurora Sealmasters Men's team finished fifth in the nation in 1950. The Sealmasters won National Championships in 1959, 1961, 1965, and 1967, and World Championships in 1966 and 1968. The Sealmasters played their games at Stevens-Adamson Field, a significant fastpitch stadium on Ridgeway Avenue on the city's southwest side. The Sealmasters hosted many famous competitors from all over the United States, most notably Eddie Feigner and The King and His Court, as well as international opponents. There were many different and competitive men's leagues in Aurora from the 1960s through the mid-1990s. There are still a few leagues and teams playing to this day.

In golf, the Stonebridge Country Club, on Aurora's far northeast side, was home to the LPGA Tour's Kellogg-Keebler Classic from 2002 to 2004. Stonebridge also hosted the Ameritech Senior Open from 1991 to 1995 on the Senior PGA Tour.

Aurora University has Men's and Women's basketball, golf, tennis, track and field and cross country, men's and women's lacrosse. It also has a men's football and baseball team, as well as women's softball and volleyball teams. Aurora University athletics are in Division III.

High school athletics are a major event in the city, as East and West Aurora High Schools have been rivals in all sports for over 100 years.

Infrastructure

Transportation
Aurora has long been a regional transportation hub. Aurora's transportation system connects its residents and visitors to neighboring towns and cities. The city is served by several major roadways, including Interstate 88 and Illinois Route 59, making it easily accessible by car. Additionally, Aurora offers various public transportation options, including two Metra commuter stops, Pace Bus services, and an expanding bicycle network.

Train Service 

The city is the final stop of the Burlington Northern Santa Fe line of the Metra commuter rail system, allowing rail service into Chicago.  The city also has a stop at the Rt. 59 station on the BNSF Line. This station is on the border with Naperville and each city maintains a parking lot on their respective side of the tracks. The BNSF Railroad owns and maintains a rail yard in Aurora, which they named Eola Yard.

Bus Service 
Pace Suburban Bus operates local bus service in Aurora six days a week (no service on Sundays) and connects to cities and village such as Naperville, Geneva, Batavia, Oswego, and St. Charles. Pace Bus offers 6 fixed-route bus connections at the Aurora Transportation Center.  The City of Aurora also has two Pace On Demand service zones allowing riders to reserve a trip to anywhere within one of the On Demand Zones.  Aurora resident's within Kane County are eligible to participate in the Ride in Kane transportation program, providing curb to curb bus or taxi service to individuals 65 and older, individuals with a disability, and those with low income.

Aviation 
The Aurora Municipal Airport is a general aviation airport in Sugar Grove, Illinois, just outside Aurora. Although the airport is in Sugar Grove, it is owned and operated by the City of Aurora. The Aurora Airport is designed as a reliever airport for Chicago's O'Hare and Midway Airports and also handles a lot of international cargo. It is capable of landing Boeing 757 aircraft. In addition, the Federal Aviation Administration's (FAA) Chicago Air Route Traffic Control Center is on Aurora's west side.

Bike Network 
Aurora aims to be a bicycle-friendly community and promotes bicycling throughout the city. To create a more bike-friendly downtown, in July 2020, the City of Aurora partnered with Koloni to launch its new Fox Valley Bike Share program.  The city has also invested in bike infrastructure improvement projects, further expanding the network of bike lanes and multi-use paths. The completion of a bridge in 2021 over the Fox River in Aurora  provides a safe and direct route for bicyclists and pedestrians from the Aurora Transportation Center to the Fox River Trail.

Historic Transit 
Aurora does not have a stop for Amtrak trains, as the old station closed in the 1980s. The closest Amtrak station is in Naperville. Aurora City Lines, the old city bus lines, was closed in the late 1980s in favor of regional bus service. Greyhound buses used to stop at the Aurora Transportation Center, but service was discontinued on September 7, 2011. Aurora also had an extensive streetcar system, operated by the Aurora, Elgin and Fox River Electric Company, that served most neighborhoods. Aurora was served by a number of interurban lines, the most prominent of which was the Chicago Aurora and Elgin Railroad which provided service into Chicago. The STAR Line would have included a third station at Ferry Rd. north of the BNSF Line.

Major highways 
Major highways in Aurora include:

Interstate Highways
 Interstate 88

US Highways
 US 30
 US 34

Illinois Highways
 Route 25
 Route 31
 Route 56
 Route 59
 Route 110

Healthcare 

Aurora has two hospitals, one on the west side, Presence Mercy Medical Center, and one in Fox Valley, Rush–Copley Medical Center.

There are other area hospitals, including Edward Hospital in Naperville, Delnor Hospital in Geneva, Central DuPage in Winfield and a Level 1 Trauma center at Good Samaritan in Downers Grove.

Aurora had three hospitals, St. Joseph Hospital, on the west side, St. Charles hospital, east of downtown, and Copley Memorial Hospital, on the east side. St Joseph and St, Charles hospitals have been converted into senior living centers, and the old Copley hospital, which was one of the largest hospitals in the area, sits vacant. The city of Aurora recently demolished the old smokestacks from the hospital, as they were starting to crumble.

Dreyer Medical Clinic and several other independent clinics and medical groups are spread throughout the city. The area surrounding Provena Mercy has evolved into a diverse healthcare district with services and offices.

Education

The city is home to Aurora University, two branches of Waubonsee Community College, and a branch of Rasmussen College. According to the census of Aurora's population over the age of twenty-five, 26% hold a bachelor's degree.

Starting in the 1860s, Aurora was served by two main school systems, one on either side of the Fox River, which physically divides the city. In the mid-20th century, the district on the western side of the river expanded to include the students in the village of North Aurora, including the North Aurorans on the east side of the Fox.  Additionally, in 1972, the Indian Prairie School District (IPSD) 204 was formed to serve the far eastern portion of Aurora within DuPage County. All three districts (Aurora Public Schools: West Side (District 129), Aurora Public Schools: East Side (District 131) and IPSD) have their headquarters and administrative offices within the Aurora city limits. As of 2005, there were at least forty public schools within Aurora city limits, serving residents of Aurora and neighboring communities.

Due to the city's size, these are not the only three school systems serving residents – some students in the far north end of the city (north of I88 in Kane County) attend Batavia public schools, some on the far southwest side attend Kaneland CUSD 302 schools (headquartered in Maple Park), and some students in the far south end of the city (a small corner of the Kane, Kendall and Will County portions) attend Oswego public schools. Four of the schools in Oswego CUSD 308, Wheatlands Elementary, Homestead Elementary, Wolf's Crossing Elementary, and Bednarcik Junior High are within Aurora's limits.

The Illinois Mathematics and Science Academy (IMSA) is a state-funded residential magnet school for grades 10 to 12. While IMSA operates under public funds (and uses the site originally designated West Aurora High School North Campus), it is managed independently of Aurora's other public schools. Any Illinois student who meets admission requirements may apply to attend IMSA, tuition free.

Aurora is also home to other private schools. Within Aurora, there are three Roman Catholic High Schools, Aurora Central Catholic (Diocese of Rockford), Rosary, and Marmion Academy (Order of St. Benedict), and seven Catholic elementary schools operated by the Diocese of Rockford. Along with these three schools is Aurora Christian High School and Elementary School and Resurrection Lutheran School, a Pre-K-8 grade school of the Wisconsin Evangelical Lutheran Synod.  Aurora is also home to Fox Valley Montessori School, one of the first Montessori schools established in Illinois in 1969, which offers a preschool and elementary program.

The above-named districts have forty-six public schools within the city limits of Aurora (seventeen for District #131, thirteen for District #129, eleven for District #204, four for Oswego District #308 and the Illinois Mathematics and Science Academy).

Library
The Aurora Public Library includes the main library, two branches, an express center, a support facility and a bookmobile. The library operations budget is $10 million and the staff numbers 85 full-time and 89 part-time employees. The library was funded in 1901 through a Carnegie grant. The Santori Public Library, the main library, was opened in June 2015, and offers a 3D printer and a digital media lab in addition to standard book and media services.

Notable people

Media
In addition to the Chicago broadcast stations, the following are based in Aurora:

Television 
 WXFT-DT – TeleFutura Channel 50/60.1, Aurora/Chicago
 WPVN-CD – Polnet Communications Channel 20, Aurora
 Aurora Community TV (ACTV) – Channel 10
 Total Living Network (TLN)
 Waubonsee Community College Educational Television – Comcast Channel 99

Radio
WBIG (AM) 1280 Aurora
WERV-FM 95.9 Aurora
WLEY-FM 107.9 Aurora

Newspapers
The Beacon-News is Aurora's oldest business, first published in 1846, and is part of the Tribune Publishing. The newspaper has two editions: the Aurora edition and the Kendall County edition. The Beacon-News has been recognized repeatedly by the Associated Press, Illinois Press Association, Northern Illinois Newspaper Association and the Chicago Headline Club as one of the best daily newspapers in Illinois.

Crime and social issues
In 2008, reported major crimes in Aurora were at their lowest level in nearly three decades. The Chief of Police attributed the drop to a number of factors but especially credited the hard work of the city's police officers and the increase in anti-gang priorities. Gang violence had reached a high in the 1990s, with the city averaging nearly 30 murders per year. In 2008, Aurora only had 2 murders. In July 2007, the Aurora Police Department and the FBI conducted "Operation First Degree Burn," a sweep that resulted in the successful arrest of 31 alleged Latin Kings gang members suspected of 22 murders dating back to the mid-1990s. Aurora has also adopted programs such as CeaseFire to reduce gang violence and prevent youths from joining gangs. Aurora had 7 murders in 2016.

Like other large Midwestern cities that once relied on manufacturing as an economic basis, Aurora has a large number of abandoned buildings and vacant lots, especially in older sections of the city. Efforts are ongoing to rehabilitate these areas.

Environmentally, Aurora has long dealt with pollution of the Fox River. The river was heavily polluted up until the 1970s by factories that had lined the river for over a century. Cleanup efforts have been successful with the help of state grants and volunteer efforts.

2014 Chicago Air Route Traffic Control Center fire 
On September 26, 2014, a fire at an air traffic control edifice in Aurora (also known as the "Chicago Center") caused nearly 2000 airline flights to be grounded.

Brian Howard, an employee of Harris Corporation, was charged in the incident.

2019 shooting 

At approximately 1:30 p.m. on February 15, 2019, police responded to an active shooter situation in west Aurora to find that 45-year-old Gary Martin had opened fire on fellow employees at the Henry Pratt Company after being terminated from the company. Five officers and several civilians were injured in the ensuing standoff, after which police entered the building and killed Martin. In total, the incident left six dead (including the gunman) and numerous others wounded. It was the first major shooting in the town's history.

Local sights

Sister cities 
  Iguala, Mexico, since 2007

See also

References

External links 

 
 Aurora Area Convention and Visitors Bureau
 Aurora Regional Chamber of Commerce
 Aurora, Illinois in the Electronic Encyclopedia of Chicago

 
1834 establishments in Illinois
Chicago metropolitan area
Cities in Illinois
Cities in DuPage County, Illinois
Cities in Kane County, Illinois
Cities in Kendall County, Illinois
Cities in Will County, Illinois
Populated places established in 1834
Majority-minority cities and towns in DuPage County, Illinois
Majority-minority cities and towns in Kane County, Illinois
Majority-minority cities and towns in Will County, Illinois